Shrine of St. Anthony may refer to:

 Shrine of St. Anthony (Boston)
 Shrine of St. Anthony (Maryland)
 Saint Anthony's Chapel (Pittsburgh)
 St. Antony's Shrine, Kachchatheevu
 St. Anthony's Shrine, Kochchikade
 St. Anthony's Church, Wahakotte